Abraham Jonas (1890 – 8 January 1933) was a rugby league footballer in the Australian competition - the New South Wales Rugby League (NSWRL).

Jonas played for the Eastern Suburbs club in the seasons 1915–16. He is listed on the Sydney Roosters Player Register as player No. 85.

He died at Dee Why Beach after suffering a heart attack, age 41, on 8 January 1933.

References

External links
 The Encyclopedia Of Rugby League; Alan Whiticker & Glen Hudson

Australian rugby league players
Sydney Roosters players
1890 births
1933 deaths
Place of birth missing